Cervical spinal nerve 4, also called C4, is a spinal nerve of the cervical segment.  It originates from the spinal cord above the 4th cervical vertebra (C4). It contributes nerve fibers to the phrenic nerve, the motor nerve to the thoracoabdominal diaphragm. It also provides motor nerves for the longus capitis, longus colli, anterior scalene, middle scalene, and levator scapulae muscles. C4 contributes some sensory fibers to the supraclavicular nerves, responsible for sensation from the skin above the clavicle.

Additional Images

References

Spinal nerves